The 2018 Arkansas State Red Wolves football team represented Arkansas State University in the 2018 NCAA Division I FBS football season. The Red Wolves played their home games at Centennial Bank Stadium in Jonesboro, Arkansas, and competed in the West Division of the Sun Belt Conference. They were led by fifth-year head coach Blake Anderson.

Previous season
The Red Wolves finished the 2017 season 7–5, 6–2 in Sun Belt play to finish in third place. They received a bid to the Camellia Bowl where they lost to Middle Tennessee.

Preseason

Award watch lists
Listed in the order that they were released

Sun Belt coaches poll
On July 19, 2018, the Sun Belt released their preseason coaches poll with the Red Wolves predicted to finish as champions of the West Division. They were also predicted to win the Sun Belt Championship game.

Preseason All-Sun Belt Teams
The Red Wolves had nine players selected to the preseason all-Sun Belt teams. Quarterback Justice Hansen was selected as the preseason offensive player of the year.

Offense

1st team

Justice Hansen – QB

Warren Wand – RB

Justin McInnis – WR

Lanard Bonner– OL

2nd team

Jacob Still – OL

Defense

1st team

Ronheen Bingham – DL

Justin Clifton – DB

2nd team

BJ Edmonds – DB

Special teams

2nd team

Cody Grace – P

Schedule

Schedule Source:

Game summaries

Southeast Missouri State

at Alabama

at Tulsa

UNLV

at Georgia Southern

Appalachian State

Georgia State

at Louisiana

South Alabama

at Coastal Carolina

Louisiana–Monroe

at Texas State

vs. Nevada (Arizona Bowl)

References

Arkansas State
Arkansas State Red Wolves football seasons
Arkansas State Red Wolves football